Saint Lucian cuisine is a combination of French, East Indian and British dishes. Before colonization, the Caribs and the Arawaks occupied the island, surviving on its various natural fruits and vegetables like mangoes, oranges, tangerines, avocados, and breadfruits.

Specialties

St Lucia is known for its national dish consisting of green bananas and salt fish locally known as green figs and saltfish; breadfruit and salt fish is also an alternative favourite among the locals. 

Other speciality dishes include a dish known as bouyon, which is a thick red beans one pot soup meal made of meat, ground provisions (ground tuber foods) and vegetables. Other popular local dishes include callaloo soup, Accra (a fried snack composed of flour, egg, seasoning and the main ingredient of saltfish, usually prepared around Easter), green fig salad, cocoa tea (a traditional breakfast spiced hot drink) and bakes (which is a fried bread; it is also referred to as floats) among others. 

The island's British and Indian influences are seen in the variety of spices used in its cuisine, which include garlic, cinnamon, nutmeg, cocoa, parsley, cloves, and allspice. A wide range of local fruits like golden apples, mangoes, starfruit, tamarind are used to make juices, although lime juice (lime squash) seems a more popular choice to be enjoyed in conjunction with the local delicacies.

See also
Piton beer
Tourism in Saint Lucia
Caribbean cuisine

References

 
Caribbean cuisine
Cuisine by country